Artix is a commune in the Ariège department in the Occitanie region of south-western France.

The inhabitants of the commune are known as Articois or Articoises.

Geography
Artix is located some 7 km south-west of Pamiers and 4 km south of Saint-Victor-Rouzaud. Access to the commune is by the D13 road from Saint-Victor-Rouzaud in the north and passing through from the northern to the eastern edge of the commune continuing to Rieux-de-Pelleport in the south-east. Access to the village is by the Souleille de Touron country road branching off the D13 and going west to the village and continuing west to join the D431. There is the hamlet of Le Prieu on the northern border of the commune. The commune is mixed farmland and forest.

The Ruisseau de Babots rises in the north of the commune and flows north to join the Estrique. The Ruisseau de Grave forms the western border of the commune as it flows north-east to join the Estrique. The Ruisseau d'Artix rises in the south of the commune and flows north-east gathering tributaries continuing east to join the Ariège near Rieux-de-Pelleport.

Neighbouring communes and villages

History
The village of Artix seems to be old as it was apparently present in 960 in the will of the Bishop of Toulouse (Hugues). The French Wars of Religion ravaged the commune: in 1562 the Protestants pillaged crops. The church was also destroyed. Finally in 1621 the Baron of Léran plundered the Chateau of Artix.

Administration

List of Successive Mayors

Demography
In 2017 the commune had 141 inhabitants.

See also
Communes of the Ariège department

References

External links
Artix on the National Geographic Institute website 
Artix on Géoportail, National Geographic Institute (IGN) website 
Artix on the 1750 Cassini Map

Communes of Ariège (department)